Marla Landi, Lady Dashwood (born Marcella Teresa Scarafia in 1933, Turin, Italy) is an Italian-born British film actress and television presenter.

Career
Landi's major roles included Across the Bridge (1957), Dublin Nightmare (1958), First Man into Space (1959), The Murder Game (1965), and the Hammer films The Hound of the Baskervilles (1959, as Cecile Stapleton) and The Pirates of Blood River (1962). She was a Play School presenter from 1964 to 1970. Joy Whitby, the programme's creator and earliest producer, recalled in 2013: "She spoke English with a heavy accent, but she was very loveable and children adored her". Landi also presented Parliamo Italiano. She appeared in an episode of the television version of Hancock's Half Hour known as  "The Italian Maid" in 1959.

She was a photographic model and had a number of magazine covers including Vogue, Harper's Bazaar and Tatler.  She later became the Fashion editor for Harper's Bazaar. She then went on to set up her own wig business.

Personal life and honours
In 1977, she married Sir Francis Dashwood, 11th Baronet;  they lived at West Wycombe House in Buckinghamshire.

She was made a Knight of the Order of Merit of the Italian Republic for promoting the Italian language and culture in the United Kingdom.

Filmography

References

External links
 

British actresses
1933 births
Living people
British female models
Models from Turin
Italian emigrants to the United Kingdom
Actors from Turin
BBC television presenters